The 1963 NAIA men's basketball tournament was held March 11–16 at Municipal Auditorium in Kansas City, Missouri. The 26th annual NAIA basketball tournament featured 32 teams playing in a single-elimination format. This tournament did not feature any games going into overtime. This was the first tournament to feature a Leading Scorer, and Leading Rebounder awards. They were presented to Mel Gibson, Willis Reed and Lucious Jackson respectively. In the inaugural year of the Leading Scorer award, there was a tie. This would not happen again until 1981.

Awards and honors
Leading scorers; tie: Mel Gibson, Western Carolina (N.C.) 5 games, 60 field goals 17 free throws 137 total points (27.4 average points per game) and Willis Reed, Grambling (La.) 5 games, 58 field goals, 21 free throws, 137 total points (27.4 average points per game)
Leading rebounder: Lucious Jackson, Pan American (Texas), 5 games, 93 rebounds (18.6 rebounds per game)
Player of the Year: est. 1994
Most rebounds; career continues: 180, Lucious Jackson, Pan American (Texas), (1962,63,64)
All-time leading scorer; second appearance: Lucious Jackson, 7th Pan American (Texas) (1962,63,64), 12 games, 117 field goals, 67 free throws, 301 total points, 25.0 average per game; Willis Reed, 16th Grambling (La.) (1961,63,64), 12 games 108 field goals 39 free throws 265 total points, 22.8 average per
All-time leading scorer; final appearance: Hershell West, 15th Grambling (La.) (1960,61,63), 13 games, 116 field goals, 37 free throws, 269 total points, 20.7 average per game.

1963 NAIA bracket

Third-place game
The third-place game featured the losing teams from the national semifinalist to determine 3rd and 4th places in the tournament. This game was played until 1988.

See also
 1963 NCAA University Division basketball tournament
 1963 NCAA College Division basketball tournament

References

NAIA Men's Basketball Championship
Tournament
NAIA men's basketball tournament
NAIA men's basketball tournament
College basketball tournaments in Missouri
Basketball competitions in Kansas City, Missouri